Joseph Bouck (July 22, 1788 – March 30, 1858) was an American politician and a U.S. Representative from New York serving one term from 1831 to 1833.

Biography
Born on Bouck's Island, near Fultonham, New York, Bouck attended the rural schools of his native county. He was brother of William C. Bouck, and uncle of Gabriel Bouck.

Career
Bouck engaged in agricultural pursuits for many years in Schoharie County until his change of residence to Middleburgh. He served as inspector of turnpike roads in Schoharie County in 1828.

Tenure in Congress 
Elected as a Jacksonian to the Twenty-second Congress Bouck served as United States Representative for the twelfth district of New York from March 4, 1831, to March 3, 1833. He returned to his private life in Middleburgh, New York.

Death
Bouck died on March 30, 1858 (age 69 years, 251 days). He is interred at Middleburgh Cemetery, Middleburgh, New York.
Resided in Middleburgh, New York, until his death on March 30, 1858.

References

External links

The Political Graveyard
Govtrack US Congress

1788 births
1858 deaths
Jacksonian members of the United States House of Representatives from New York (state)
People from Middleburgh, New York
19th-century American politicians
Members of the United States House of Representatives from New York (state)